The Blue Cloak, or De Blauwe Huik, refers to an old concept for a popular 16th-century print series featuring Flemish proverbs. The prints were generally captioned according to each depicted proverb, and central to these was a woman pulling a cloak over a man. That proverb is also central to a 1559 painting called Netherlandish Proverbs by Pieter Bruegel the Elder. 

In the print versions, the blue cloak or huik plays the central role:

Later versions:
The painter David Teniers the Younger, who married Brueghel's granddaughter, also made a painting with his own modern interpretation of the same proverbs in 1645, which also surround a central "Blue cloak" scene:

Meaning
The central figure is a woman who is pulling a blue cloak over her husband. She is literally pulling the wool over his eyes. This act is a metaphor for adultery, explicitly the adultery of the woman, and the cloak a deceitful "coverup" that helps her husband to "not see it", which is also indicated by another proverb or expression in the Galle engraving showing a man with his fingers in front of his eyes with the remark "Dese siet door de vingeren" (English: This one acts blind but is 'peeking through his fingers').

Cloak color

The cloak was called a 'huyck' (huik in modern Dutch), and it was a black garment that was worn by upperclass women when they went outside the home from the 16th century onwards. It is unknown why the color blue of the huik plays a role in the proverb. That the huik was meant to be blue was emphasized not only by the common title, but also by the use of a black huik elsewhere in the painting. This secondary appearance of the huik can also be seen in the Hogenberg and Galle engravings, though it doesn't play a central role.

Veils
Proverbs
History of Flanders